Shani is one of the Navagraha (the nine primary celestial beings) in Hindu astrology. It may also refer to:

People

Given name 
Shani Arshad, Pakistani musician
Shani Bloch (born 1979), Israeli Olympic racing cyclist
Shani Cooper, Israeli diplomat
Shani David (born 1991), Israeli soccer player
Shani Davis (born 1982), American speed skater
Shani Kedmi (born 1977), Israeli Olympic competitive sailor
Shani Mahadevappa, Indian actor
Shani Mootoo (born 1958), Canadian writer
Shani Wallis (born 1933), English actress and singer

Surname 
Ehud Shani (born 1957), general in the Israel Defense Forces and currently Head of C4I and Senior Field Commander
Michael Shani, Israeli cellist and conductor
Mordechai Shani, Israeli physician and Director General of the Sheba Medical Center
Shaul Shani (born c. 1955), Israeli billionaire businessman and investor

Fictional characters 
Shani, in The Witcher novels and video games
Shani, the Hindu deity, in Karmaphal Daata Shani, an Indian TV series

Places 
Mount Shani, a mountain in the Caucasus
Shani Peak, a mountain in the south of Naltar Pass in the Gilgit District of Northern Areas of Pakistan
Shani Glacier, a glacier in the north of Shani Peak in Naltar Valley, Pakistan
Shani, Nigeria, a local government area of Kano State
Livne, an Israeli settlement also known as Shani
Shani Shingnapur, a village in India dedicated to the Hindu god Shani

Other uses 
Shani (drink), a soft drink brand of PepsiCo
The Marvelous World of Shani or simply Shani, a short-lived doll line from Mattel featuring African American characters
Aerodyne Shani, a French two-place paraglider design

See also
Shaani, 1989 Pakistani film by Saeed Rizvi
Schani, family nickname for composer Johann Strauss II
Sani people, an ethnic minority in Yunnan, China, classified as a branch of the Yi people by the Chinese government
Seni, an ancient Egyptian viceroy of Kush